The 6th Regiment may refer to:

France
 6th Foreign Infantry Regiment

Greece
 6th Infantry Regiment (Greece)
 6th Archipelago Regiment

United States
 6th Marine Regiment (United States)
 6th United States Colored Infantry Regiment
 6th Cavalry Regiment (United States)
 6th Infantry Regiment (United States)

United Kingdom
 6th Regiment of Foot (later Royal Warwickshire Fusiliers)